William Myron Buell (January 4, 1810 – July 11, 1869) was an American politician who founded the village of Carey, Ohio and served as a member of the California State Assembly for the 12th District, 1861–62, from Klamath County. He was a Douglas Democrat.

References

External links
William M. Buell at The Political Graveyard
History of Wyandot Co., Ohio with much information on William M. Buell

1810 births
1869 deaths
Members of the California State Assembly
19th-century American politicians
People from Carey, Ohio